Bebearia maximiana, the maximal forester, is a butterfly in the family Nymphalidae. It is found in Nigeria, Cameroon, Gabon and the Democratic Republic of the Congo. The habitat consists of forests.

The larvae feed on an unidentified dicotyledonous tree.

Subspecies
Bebearia maximiana maximiana (Nigeria: Cross River loop, Cameroon, Democratic Republic of the Congo: Ubangi, Mongala, Uele, northern Kivu and Lualaba)
Bebearia maximiana ata Hecq, 1990 (Gabon)

References

Butterflies described in 1891
maximiana
Butterflies of Africa